Chimera is the third full length album by the Norwegian black metal band Mayhem. It is the fourth and last main Mayhem release with the vocalist Sven Erik Kristiansen (Maniac). TurboNatas of the Norwegian band Red Harvest provided the album artwork. The cover image is a screenshot from the 1922 Swedish silent film Häxan.

Track listing

Personnel
Mayhem
Maniac – vocals
Blasphemer – guitar
Necrobutcher – bass 
Hellhammer – drums
Production
Produced by Blasphemer
Engineered by Borge Finstad
Mixed by Blasphemer, Hellhammer and Borge Finstad
Mastered by Morten Lund

Charts

References

Mayhem (band) albums
2003 albums
Season of Mist albums